

List of countries

Dependencies
Politics of the Falkland Islands
List of political parties in French Guiana
List of political parties in South Georgia and the South Sandwich Islands

South America